Inchman may refer to: 

 Several species of the ant genus Myrmecia
 One of the fictional Races of Bas-Lag
 A song by Jack Stauber